The 1919 Miami Redskins football team was an American football team that represented Miami University as a member of the Ohio Athletic Conference (OAC) during the 1919 college football season. In its second season under head coach George Little, Miami compiled a 7–1 record (7–1 against conference opponents) and finished in fourth place out of 16 teams in the OAC.

Schedule

References

Miami
Miami RedHawks football seasons
Miami Redskins football